Errett is a given name. Notable people with the name include:

Errett Bishop (1928–1983), American mathematician known for his work on analysis
Errett Callahan (1937–2019), American archaeologist, flintknapper, and pioneer in experimental archaeology and lithic replication studies
Errett Lobban Cord (1894–1974), leader in United States transport during the early and middle 20th century
Errett P. Scrivner (1898–1978), U.S. Representative from Kansas

See also
Russell Errett (1817–1891), Republican member of the U.S. House of Representatives from Pennsylvania